Molyn may refer to:

Thomas Molyn
Pieter Molyn
Molyn (Metal Master)